Roland Diethart (born 3 August 1973) is an Austrian former cross-country skier. He competed in the men's relay event at the 2006 Winter Olympics.

References

External links
 

1973 births
Living people
Austrian male cross-country skiers
Olympic cross-country skiers of Austria
Cross-country skiers at the 2006 Winter Olympics
People from Leoben
Sportspeople from Styria
21st-century Austrian people